The Kaohsiung City Government is the municipal government of Kaohsiung. It was formed after the merger of Kaohsiung County and Kaohsiung City in December 2010. Its chief administrator is the directly elected Mayor of Kaohsiung.

History

In 1924,  was upgraded to city status, and the Takao City Office was established in modern-day Gushan by the Japanese government which reported directly to Takao Prefecture. The city hall was located at the modern-day  temple. The second city hall was built in 1938 at modern-day Zhongzheng 4th Road, Yancheng District and commissioned on 16 September 1939.

After the handover of Taiwan from Japan to the Republic of China in 1945, the city was renamed Kaohsiung City Government.

A fast-growing population and rapid industrial and commercial development caused the expansion of the city government as well. In 1992, the city government moved to the new city hall building at Xiwei 3rd Road in Lingya District. The former city hall building in Yancheng District was turned into the Kaohsiung Museum of History on 25 October 1998.

Administration

Bureaus

 Civil Affairs Bureau
 Finance Bureau
 Education Bureau
 Economic Development Bureau
 Marine Bureau
 Agriculture Bureau
 Tourism Bureau
 Urban Development Bureau
 Public Works Bureau
 Water Resources Bureau
 Social Affairs Bureau
 Labor Affairs Bureau
 Kaohsiung City Police Department
 Fire Bureau
 Department of Health
 Environmental Protection Bureau
 Kaohsiung Mass Rapid Transit
 Bureau of Cultural Affairs
 Transportation Bureau
 Legal Affairs Bureau
 Military service Bureau
 Land Administration Bureau
 Information Bureau

Offices
 Secretariat
 Department of Budget, Accounting and Statistics
 Personnel Department
 Civil Service Ethics Office

Commissions
 Research, Development and Evaluation Commission
 Indigenous Affairs Commission
 Hakka Affairs Committee

Mayor

The mayor of Kaohsiung City is the chief executive officer of the city. The mayor is elected for a four-year term and limited to serving no more than two terms. Under the mayor there are 3 deputy mayors, 1 secretary-general, 2 deputy secretary-generals and 30 principal officers. The incumbent Mayor of Kaohsiung is Chen Chi-mai of Democratic Progressive Party.

See also
 Kaohsiung City Council
 Mayor of Kaohsiung
 List of county magistrates of Kaohsiung

Notes

Words in native languages

References

External links

 

Government of Kaohsiung
Local governments of the Republic of China